Oskarsson, Oskarson, Oscarsson, Oscarson or Óskarsson is a common surname in Sweden and Iceland respectively, and may refer to:

Albert Óskarsson (born 1968), Icelandic basketball player
Bonnie L. Oscarson (born 1950), Fourteenth president of the Young Women organization of the Church of Jesus Christ of Latter-day Saints
Christina Oskarsson (born 1951), Swedish social democratic politician
David Oscarson (born 1966), Swedish American pen designer
James Oscarson (born 1957), Swedish American politician
Magnus Oscarsson (born 1970), Swedish politican
Markus Oscarsson (born 1977), Swedish sprint canoeist
Mattias Oscarsson (born 1975), Swedish sprint canoeist
Mikael Oscarsson (born 1967), Swedish Christian Democrat politician
Mikael Oskarsson, Swedish comic creator, worked in various genres in both fanzine and professional contexts
Per Oscarsson (1927–2010), Swedish film actor
Peter Oskarson (born 1951), Swedish theatre director
Staffan Oscarsson (born 1951), Swedish sports shooter
Stina Oscarson (born 1975), Swedish theater director and author

Icelandic-language surnames
Swedish-language surnames
Patronymic surnames
Surnames from given names